Maryem Tollar  (born 1968 in Cairo, Egypt) is a Toronto-based singer who primarily sings Arabic songs. She played with her own band called Mernie!.

Born in Cairo, Maryem went to Halifax, Nova Scotia, Canada with her parents when she was one year old in 1969. Four years later, her father began working in Qatar and Saudi Arabia, so her family moved back to the Middle East and stayed there until she graduated from The American University in Cairo. Throughout those times, Maryem always had a taste for music and sang in every school production. Her parents were originally against the idea of Maryem becoming a singer, but after university, Maryem started pursuing her dream. She first performed with Toronto-based Arab band Hot D.A.M. and later sang in Arabic for her brother's compositions. Later, she went to Syria and Egypt to further her studies and gained recognition from the Canada Council. She began receiving calls to perform with different groups as well as for recording sessions for commercials and films. Eventually, Maryem started a music group called "Mernie!" with her husband, Ernie Tollar. The band is a 10 piece ensemble while she and her husband compose all of the music and everyone in the band come from different cultural backgrounds. Together, they have made one CD so far, entitled Flowers of Forgiveness.

In 2007, director Liz Marshall made a Bravo!FACT funded a video for the Arabic lament "Mawal Saba".

Maryem sang "Mayya Mayya" song for the 2007 Bollywood film, Guru, composed by A. R. Rahman. Tollar is the artist behind the ending credits theme song used in the Canadian sitcom, Little Mosque on the Prairie, a rendition of the popular Islamic praise song Tala‘al Badru ‘Alayna (the press kit on her website misidentifies the show as "Little Mosque on the Prairies").

Tollar was a candidate for the Green Party in the riding of Toronto—Danforth in the 2021 federal election.

Discography
 Book of Life album featuring Stolen Childhood, lyrics by Ehab Lotayef and other songs

References

External links 
 
 Video for Mawal Saba

1968 births
Living people
Egyptian emigrants to Canada
Musicians from Cairo
Musicians from Toronto
Canadian women pop singers